Minute of Fame is a Russian television talent show competition originating from the Got Talent series and which started in February 2007 on 1TV.
For the first two seasons it was hosted by Garik Martirosyan, replaced in the 3rd season by Alexander Tsekalo, then in the 4th season the hosts were Alexander Oleshko and Ville Haapasalo, and in the 5th and 6th seasons Julia Kovalchuk took over from Haapasalo.

Judges 
Alexander Maslyakov, host of KVN, head judge, seasons 1-8;
Leonid Parfyonov, journalist, season 4.
Tatyana Tolstaya, writer, seasons 1-3.
Mariya Shukshina, TV host show season 5.
Larissa Guzeyeva, TV host show seasons 6-8.
In the first season, the role of third judge was filled by different visitor, but in the second season a third permanent judge appeared is Alexander Tsekalo. In the third and following seasons, the third judge was again a series of visitors.
Sergei Yursky, actor, seasons 7 and 9.
Sergei Svetlakov, actor, TV host, season 9.
Renata Litvinova, actress, TV host, season 9.
Vladimir Posner, TV journalist, writer and political thinker, season 9.

Rules 
In the qualifying rounds participants appear before the judges and an audience to demonstrate their talent, and from there are either rejected by the judges or moved on to the next round. 
In the 1st season each judge had the ability to call a halt to the demonstration with a rejection button, if all 3 judges pressed the button, the demonstration was interrupted and the participant rejected. In the 2nd this was removed and each participant could perform their full demonstration, after which each judges voted «yes» or «no», with the majority ruling and the head judge acting as tie-breaker.

Beginning with the 2nd season the semi-finals were removed, participant who passed the qualifying rounds went straight to the final round.

In the 1st-3rd seasons, the winner of the show received 1,000,000 rubles.

In the 4th season the winner of the show received 10,000,000 rubles.

From the middle of the 4th season (from October 5 to December 29, 2009) per week from network «Eldorado» played out cash prizes among viewers.

In the 5th season the winner of the show received 1,000,000 rubles, 1 kg of gold and a contract with the Moscow Circus.

In the 6th season, the show underwent a major change. Firstly the name was changed to «Minute of Fame - Dreams Come True». At the end of each qualifying round the jury picks 1 act, not necessarily one who passed on to audience voting, and gives them a choice: either have their dream fulfilled, or be entered directly into the finals without requiring the audience to vote them there, meaning they still have a chance to win the 1,000,000 rubles prizel. Second, the participants were given mentors. Carmen Rust and Edgard Zapashny, then Svetlana Druzhinina and Igor Zhizhikin from the 9th qualifying round onwards, would instruct participants in circus genres, and Anastasia Zavorotnyuk and Yegor Druzhinin would mentor those in other artistic genres.

In the 7th season of the show on the new scenario, part of the participants' «Minute of Fame» now is not removed in the studio and outdoors. This time, the organizers decided that participants must represent Russia, and therefore the motto of the project at this time is «Minute of Fame is sweeping the country». The participation of foreign visitors is now excluded. In honor of the five-year anniversary of the producers even changed the standard rules of the program. Now the film crew travels to cities in Russia and filmes unique acts right away from the contestants who for various reasons can't come to Moscow. By new rules it's for such numbers jury does not vote. Vote for them audience in the hall. In the semifinal get those participants for whom the vote of at least 15% of the audience in the studio. There is also no mentors, who had previously supported the contestants.

In the 8th Olympic season participants compete for the right to participate in the opening ceremony of the Winter Olympic Games in Sochi and to win one million rubles. In this season in the chair member of the jury, along with the usual three judges in each issue necessarily representative of the sport was alone, as this is Olympic season. Also in the VIP-box in each issue were present different guests with their exclusive gifts that they in the end of the tour participant were presented to get noticed. In the semifinals, participants fought a duel in the end only one of the duel taking place in the final, and the rest are eliminated. The finale was divided in two parts: in the first, participants fought for a million rubles, while the second are for participating in the opening ceremony of XXII Olympic Winter Games in Sochi.

In 9th Anniversary season the rules has changed. To advance the next rounds, the contestant have to get no less than three jury's «yes». If the contestant gets two «yes» and two «no», his destiny is in his own hands, he ought to toss a «coin of fame». If the side of a coin is the white, then the contestant won't leave the game, bu if it is the red, he is eliminated. Top prize is 5,000,000 rubles (second place — 3,000,000 rubles, third place — 1,000,000 rubles).

Series Overview

Season 1 (2007) 
Finals
 18.05.2007, Guest judge - Michael Zadornov.

 19.05.2007, Guest judge - Michael Zadornov.

 25.05.2007, Superfinal.

 26.05.2007, Award winners

Season 2 (2007) 

Finals
 11.11.2007

 25.11.2007

 02.12.2007

 09.12.2007, Super Final

Season 3 (2008) 

Finals
 07.12.2008, Guest judge - Sergey Zhigunov.

 14.12.2008, Guest judge - Zhanna Friske.

 21.12.2008, Guest judge - Filipp Kirkorov.

 28.12.2008, Jurors were not present at the gala.

Russia's Got Talent. The best (22 acts of 1-3 seasons) (16.05.2009)

Season 4 (2009-2010) 
Finals
 06.03.2010, Guest judge - Larisa Guzeyeva.

 26.03.2010, Guest judge - Valentina Tolkunova.

 16.04.2010, Guest judge - Lyudmila Maksakova.

 23.04.2010, Guest judge - Galina Volchek.

 30.04.2010, International gala, Guest judges - Barbara Brylska and Pierre Richard.

 14.05.2010, Rewards Gala, Guest judges - Barbara Brylska, Pierre Richard.

Season 5 (2010-2011) 
Finals
 11.06.2011, Guest judge - Filipp Kirkorov.

 18.06.2011, Guest judge - Nadezhda Babkina.

 25.06.2011, Guest judge - Zurab Sotkilava.

 02.07.2011, Guest judge - Vladimir Vinokur.

 09.07.2011, International, Guest judges - Sergei Garmash, Marina Neyolova, Irina Rodnina and Emir Kusturitsa.

 16.07.2011, Rewards, Guest judges - Sergei Garmash, Marina Neyolova, Irina Rodnina and Emir Kusturitsa.

Russia's Got Talent. The Best (24 acts of season 6) (13.11.2011)

Russia's Got Talent. The best (20.11.2011)

Russia's Got Talent. The best (acts for seasons 1-6) (27.11.2011)

Season 6 (2011-2012) 
Semifinals
 15.04.2012, Guest judges - Mikhail Boyarsky and Svetlana Zhiltsova.

 06.05.2012, Guest judges - Pavel Astakhov and Vitaly Klichko

 27.05.2012, Guest judges — Igor Zhizhikin, Svetlana Druzhinina, Anastasia Zavorotnyuk, Yegor Druzhinin

Finals
 03.06.2012 (international, part 1), Guest judges — Gennady Khazanov, Ville Haapasalo, Carmen Rust, Sergei Makovetsky

 17.06.2012 (international, part 2) Guest judges - Gennady Khazanov, Ville Haapasalo, Carmen Rust, Sergei Makovetsky

Russia's Got Talent. The best of 6 season (01.07.2012)

Season 7 (2012-2013) 
Semifinals
 15.12.2012, Guest judges - Ingeborga Dapkūnaitė.

 22.12.2012, Guest judges - Dmitry Nagiyev.

Finals

 06.01.2013, Guest judges - Yury Kuklachyov.

Russia's Got Talent. Gold pages (part 1) (12.01.2013) 
This special series was commented by Alexander Oleshko and Anna Shatilova

Russia's Got Talent. Gold pages (part 2) (19.01.2013) 
This series was commented by Alexander Oleshko and Larisa Guzeyeva.

Season 8 (2013-2014) 
Semifinals
 14.12.2013, Guest judges — Gennady Khazanov, Alexander Schirwindt.

 28.12.2013, Guest judges — Irina Viner, Laima Vaikule.

 11.01.2014, Guest judges — Lyudmila Maksakova, Dmitri Sautin.

 18.01.2014 (additional), Guest judges - Larisa Golubkina, Efim Shifrin

Finals
 25.01.2014, Guest judges - Marina Neyolova, Yelena Isinbayeva.

 01.02.2014, Guest judges - Marina Neyolova, Yelena Isinbayeva.

Season 9 (2017) 
On September 21, 2016 Channel One announced the casting for the new anniversary season.

Semifinals
 18.03.2017, Guest judges — Sergei Yursky, Sergei Svetlakov, Renata Litvinova, Vladimir Posner.

 25.03.2017, Guest judges — Sergei Yursky, Sergei Svetlakov, Renata Litvinova, Vladimir Posner.

 01.04.2017, Guest judges — Sergei Yursky, Sergei Svetlakov, Renata Litvinova, Vladimir Posner.

 08.04.2017, Guest judges — Sergei Yursky, Sergei Svetlakov, Renata Litvinova, Vladimir Posner.

 15.04.2017, Guest judges — Sergei Yursky, Sergei Svetlakov, Renata Litvinova, Vladimir Posner.

Finals
 22.04.2017, Guest judges — Sergei Yursky, Sergei Svetlakov, Renata Litvinova, Vladimir Posner.

 29.04.2017, Guest judges — Sergei Yursky, Sergei Svetlakov, Renata Litvinova, Vladimir Posner.

Winners 
 Maxim Tokayev (accordionist), season 1
 Dmitry Bulkin (professional acrobat), season 2
 Team «Gratsiya» (plastic), season 3
 Aleksander and Sergey Grinchenko (acrobats), season 4
 Viktor Kochkin and Daniil Anastasyin (break dancers), season 5
 Igor Butorin (hula hoops), season 6
 «I_Team» group (jumping on a trampoline), season 7
 Olga Trifonova (air gymnast), season 8
 Vardanyan brothers (power acrobatics), season 9

International Competition 
1. On January 3, 2010 an international competition was held for the participants of the "Got Talent" shows from Israel, Russia, United States, France, Germany and Argentina. Foreign participants were  assessed by Russian judges Alexander Maslyakov, Leonid Parfyonov and Vera Alentova and Russian participants were assessed by judges from the other nations, with scores were given out of 10.

Hosting the contest were singer Philip Kirkorov and actor Dmitry Nagiyev with co-hosts Alexander Oleshko and Ville Haapasalo, both actors.

Between the participants performances various Russian artists performed, including Philip Kirkorov, Lyudmila Gurchenko and Dima Bilan, Alexander Oleshko and Ekaterina Starshova, Sergey Lazarev and Lera Kudryavtseva, Dmitry Nagiyev, and VIA Gra.

The winner was a Russian participant - Gagik Aidinyan (double Michael Jackson).

2. July 9 and July 16, 2011 in the season 5 of the show "Minute of Fame" was hosted the international tournament in 2 parts, where the participants were from Russia, Sweden, United States, Germany, Great Britain, France, China and South Africa. Participants were evaluated by Sergei Garmash, Marina Neyolova, Irina Rodnina and Emir Kusturica. This contest was won by guests from South Africa, while gaining the most points - 40 points and taken the "2010-2011 Minutes of Fame" International Cup. This contest was hosted by Alexander Oleshko and Julia Kovalchuk.

3. September 4, 2011 in Russia was the opening of the season 6 of the project with a grand premiere of "Russia vs America", which had held Alexander Oleshko, Julia Kovalchuk, Valdis Pelsh and Yana Churikova. Referees rated using a 10-point scale: Russian participants were evaluated by the American jury, and Americans were evaluated by Russian jury: Alexander Tsekalo, Kristina Orbakaitė, Alexander Maslyakov and Carmen Rust. As a result, Alexander and Sergei Grinchenko (Russia) and Rigolo (America) have scored 40 points.

4. June 3 and June 17, 2012, an international competition held for the first time on two scenes in the form of 2 grand finals, where the finalists competed in 2011 from the Czech Republic, the UK, Germany, China, the United States, the Philippines and Russia. Russian Jury evaluated them on a 10-point scale. In the first final was won by participant Liu Wei from China, and in the second final was won by Victor Kochkin and Daniel Anastasin (Russia, winners of the season 5) which have scored 40 points.

This grand final was hosted by Dmitry Shepelev and Julia Vysotskaya.

Reruns 
 From July 6 to August 31, 2014, Season 8 reruns were aired.
 April 5, 2015 in the 20th anniversary of Channel One in «Channel One Collection», the Season One final was aired as the charts.

Notes 

 1.The newspaper "New Life". Interview with Dmitry Bulkin
 2.Wild meanness "Minute of Fame"
 3.Falling of the Filip Kirkorov
 4.The fall of the "Minute of Fame". Participant dropped from a height of 5 meters
 5.Member of the "Minutes of Fame" was almost killed in his speech
 6.The participant "Minutes of Fame" was taken from the show on "Ambulance"
 7.Minute of Fame. Olympic season

External links
 Official website (In Russian)

2000s Russian television series
2007 Russian television series debuts
Russia
Russian television series based on British television series
Television series by Fremantle (company)
Channel One Russia original programming